The Deputy Administrator of the National Aeronautics and Space Administration is the second-highest-ranking official of NASA, the national space agency of the United States. Administrator of NASA is NASA's chief decision maker, responsible for providing clarity to the agency's vision and serving as a source of internal leadership within NASA. The office holder also has an important place within United States space policy.

History 
The longest-running (acting) Deputy Administrator was John R. Dailey, who held the post following his retirement from the United States Marine Corps. The longest-running full deputy administrator was Hugh Latimer Dryden, who was the first deputy administrator. William R. Graham has held the post of Deputy Administrator twice, and was the acting administrator in between, as did Frederick D. Gregory. Dr. Daniel Mulville served as the acting deputy administrator twice, and was acting administrator in between.

The current Deputy Administrator is Pamela Melroy, who was confirmed by the Senate on June 17, 2021 and sworn in on June 21, 2021.

Deputy administrators

References 

 
1958 establishments in the United States